Arnica rydbergii is a North American species of flowering plant in the family Asteraceae, known by the common name Rydberg's arnica or subalpine arnica or subalpine leopardbane. It is native to western Canada (Alberta, British Columbia), and the western United States (Alaska, Washington, Oregon, Utah, Idaho, Montana, Utah, Wyoming, Colorado, South Dakota).

Arnica rydbergii is an herb up to 35 cm (14 inches) tall. Flower heads are yellow, with both ray florets and disc florets. It grows in alpine meadows and rocky slopes at high altitudes in mountainous areas.

The species is named for Swedish-American botanist Per Axel Rydberg, 1860–1931.

References

External links
Southwest Colorado Wildflowers photos of several species of Arnica
The American Southwest

rydbergii
Flora of Western Canada
Plants described in 1899
Flora of the Northwestern United States
Flora of Utah
Flora without expected TNC conservation status